Port Melbourne was an  electoral district of the Victorian Legislative Assembly. It was created in 1889, replacing the previous electorate of Sandridge, which was the former name for Port Melbourne.
Port Melbourne was defined by the Electoral Act Amendment Act 1888 (taking effect at 1889 elections) as:

It was initially won by then-Sandridge MLA Frederick Derham.

It was abolished in 1958 and merged into the electorate of Albert Park. The last MLA for Port Melbourne, Archie Todd went on to contest and win the Victorian Legislative Council seat of Melbourne West Province.

Members for Port Melbourne

Election results

Notes
 There are conflicting sources as to whether Phillip Salmon, member from 1892 to 1894, was endorsed by Labor, as this was not always clear in the then-nascent party system of the 1890s.

References

Former electoral districts of Victoria (Australia)
1889 establishments in Australia
1958 disestablishments in Australia